Bujanov is a municipality and village in Český Krumlov District in the South Bohemian Region of the Czech Republic. It has about 600 inhabitants.

Administrative parts
Villages of Skoronice, Suchdol and Zdíky are administrative parts of Bujanov.

History
The first written mention of Bujanov is from 1347.

References

Villages in Český Krumlov District